Patelloceto is a genus of African araneomorph spiders in the family Trachelidae, first described by R. Lyle & C. R. Haddad in 2010.  it contains only three species.

References

External links

Araneomorphae genera
Trachelidae